The Rainbow Landscape may refer to one of three works by Peter Paul Rubens:
The Rainbow Landscape (1632-1635), Hermitage Museum, St Petersburg
The Rainbow Landscape (1636), Wallace Collection, London
The Rainbow Landscape (1640), Alte Pinakothek, Munich
 Landscape with Rainbow (1869), Smithsonian American Art Museum

Paintings by Peter Paul Rubens